The Women's 4 x 400 metres relay event  at the 2007 European Athletics Indoor Championships was held on March 4.

Results

References
Results

4 × 400 metres relay at the European Athletics Indoor Championships
400
2007 in women's athletics